This article lists the presenters from Friday Download.

Presenters
Colour key:

Presenters

Leondre Devries is mistakenly credited as Leondre Devires in the first 5 episodes of Series 9.

Weekly presenters
After Aidan's departure in Series 6, guest presenters weekly replaced the former presenters.

Series 7

Series 8

References

Lists of actors by British television series